Llyn Llyffant is the highest lake in Wales, located at grid reference SH 687 645.
Its name translates into English as "frog lake". It lies at an elevation of approximately 815m above sea level.

References

Caerhun
Llyffant
Llyffant